Andrew Ralph Adamson  (born 1 December 1966) is a New Zealand film director, producer, and screenwriter based in Los Angeles, where he co-directed the Academy Award-winning animated films Shrek and Shrek 2. He was director, executive producer, and scriptwriter for the 2005 production of The Chronicles of Narnia: The Lion, the Witch and the Wardrobe. He also worked on the movies Batman Forever and Batman & Robin as a visual effects supervisor.

He was appointed a Member of the New Zealand Order of Merit, for services to film, in the 2006 Queen's Birthday Honours.

Personal life 
Adamson's parents were a homemaker and a computer engineer. Born in New Zealand, Adamson moved to Papua New Guinea with his parents aged eleven, and he returned to Auckland aged eighteen. When 24, he moved to San Francisco, and divided time between there and Los Angeles. Since making the Narnia films, he has settled back in New Zealand. Adamson has two children.

Career
Adamson wanted to be an architect, but missed a university enrollment deadline because of a car accident. He was recruited by Pacific Data Images to work in the USA. The company opened an office in Los Angeles. There he served as a technical director in the following movies: Toys (1992), starring Robin Williams, and Angels in the Outfield (1994), starring Danny Glover. Previously, Adamson specialised in ads but preferred the idea of telling a story in longer format. He served as visual effects supervisor in the 1995 film Batman Forever, A Time to Kill (1996), and Batman & Robin (1997).

Shrek 
Adamson directed Shrek (the first installment in the series), based on the 1990 picture book written by William Steig with a modest budget of US$60 million in 2001. However, the film became a worldwide success, taking in nearly $500 million in the box office, including more than $40 million in its opening week-end. The film featured the lead voices of Mike Myers, Eddie Murphy, Cameron Diaz and John Lithgow.

The next film in the series Shrek 2 (2004) had a big Hollywood budget of around $150 million, and was even a bigger success than the first film, taking in more than $900 million worldwide. The film opened to over $100 million, one of the highest openings ever at the time. Adamson directed this film and also wrote the story. 
 
However, he did not direct the next film in the series, Shrek the Third, as he had been contracted by Walden Media to work on The Chronicles of Narnia: The Lion, the Witch and the Wardrobe. Instead, the film was directed by Chris Miller and Raman Hui while Adamson served as executive producer. The script of the film was written by J. David Stem and Joe Stillman. The third film was financially successful, taking in more than $795 million worldwide with a budget of no more than $160 million, but received mixed reviews from critics.

The Chronicles of Narnia
Adamson achieved commercial success and worldwide attention with The Chronicles of Narnia: The Lion, the Witch and the Wardrobe, which he co-produced, co-wrote and directed.  The film is based on the book of the same name by C.S. Lewis, and won various awards, gained critical praise and was a box office success, becoming the third highest-grossing film worldwide of 2005 according to Box Office Mojo. The film opened in the US and Canada with totals of higher than $65 million and the film ended up with a worldwide gross of $744,783,957 with a budget of $180 million according to Box Office Mojo.

He returned as director to the next Narnia film: The Chronicles of Narnia: Prince Caspian which had a worldwide release in May 2008 and grossed over $419 million at the box office. Adamson returned as producer of The Chronicles of Narnia: The Voyage of the Dawn Treader released in Australia on 9 December 2010, and in the United States and UK on 10 December the same year. At the moment though, 20th Century Fox and Walden Media still hold the rights to the series, and they currently retain the option to make The Chronicles of Narnia: The Silver Chair in the future. However, 20th Century Fox and Walden Media decided to produce The Magician's Nephew as the next Narnia film instead of The Silver Chair. But, in October 2011, Douglas Gresham confirmed that Walden Media's contract with the C. S. Lewis estate had expired, and any production of a future film was on hold indefinitely.

Music
Experimental hip hop group Death Grips worked with Adamson on their 2018 album Year of the Snitch. He appears on the track "Dilemma," delivering a spoken word introduction to the song.

Filmography

Executive producer only
Ballast (2008)
 Shrek Forever After (2010)
 Puss In Boots (2011)
 Puss in Boots: The Last Wish (2022)

Other credits

Accolades 
Adamson has directed films which have received several accolades. Shrek won the Academy Award for Best Animated Feature, the BAFTA Award for Best Adapted Screenplay, and the National Board of Review Award for Best Animated Film. Shrek 2 won the People's Choice Awards for Favorite Movie Comedy, Favorite Sequel, and Favorite Animated Movie. The Chronicles of Narnia: The Lion, The Witch and the Wardrobe won the Academy Award for Best Makeup and Hairstyling, the BAFTA Award for Best Makeup and Hair, the Broadcast Film Critics Association Award for Best Family Film, and the Saturn Awards for Best Make-up and Best Special Effects.

References

External links 

1966 births
Living people
20th-century New Zealand writers
20th-century New Zealand male writers
20th-century male writers
21st-century New Zealand writers
21st-century male writers
Annie Award winners
Directors of Best Animated Feature Academy Award winners
DreamWorks Animation people
Fantasy film directors
Male screenwriters
Members of the New Zealand Order of Merit
New Zealand animated film directors
New Zealand expatriates in the United States
New Zealand film directors
New Zealand screenwriters
New Zealand film producers
Comedy film directors